In number theory, the Poussin proof is the proof of an identity related to the fractional part of a ratio.

In 1838, Peter Gustav Lejeune Dirichlet proved an approximate formula for the average number of divisors of all the numbers from 1 to n:

where d represents the divisor function, and γ represents the Euler-Mascheroni constant.

In 1898, Charles Jean de la Vallée-Poussin proved that if a large number n is divided by all the primes up to n, then the average fraction by which the quotient falls short of the next whole number is γ:

where {x} represents the fractional part of x, and π represents the prime-counting function.
For example, if we divide 29 by 2, we get 14.5, which falls short of 15 by 0.5.

References
Dirichlet, G. L. "Sur l'usage des séries infinies dans la théorie des nombres", Journal für die reine und angewandte Mathematik 18 (1838), pp. 259–274. Cited in MathWorld article "Divisor Function" below.
de la Vallée Poussin, C.-J. Untitled communication. Annales de la Societe Scientifique de Bruxelles 22 (1898), pp. 84–90. Cited in MathWorld article "Euler-Mascheroni Constant" below.

External links

Number theory